The Haldimand Rifles was an infantry regiment of the Non-Permanent Active Militia of the Canadian Militia (now the Canadian Army). In 1936, the regiment was Amalgamated with The Dufferin Rifles of Canada to form The Dufferin and Haldimand Rifles of Canada (now the 56th Field Artillery Regiment, RCA).

Lineage 
 Originated on 28 September 1866, in York, Ontario, as the 37th Haldimand Battalion of Rifles.
 Redesignated on 8 May 1900, as the 37th Regiment Haldimand Rifles.
 Redesignated on 1 May 1920, as The Haldimand Rifles.
 Amalgamated on 15 December 1936, with The Dufferin Rifles of Canada and C Company of the 3rd Machine Gun Battalion, CMGC (now The Argyll and Sutherland Highlanders of Canada (Princess Louise's)), and Redesignated as The Dufferin and Haldimand Rifles of Canada.

Chart

Perpetuations 
 114th Battalion (Haldimand), CEF

History

Early history 
With the passing of the Militia Act of 1855, the first of a number of newly-raised independent militia companies were established in and around the Haldimand County-area of Canada West (now Ontario).

During the Fenian Raids, two of these companies: the York Rifle Company and the Caledonia Rifle Company of the Haldimand County Militia would see action on June 2, 1866, alongside The Queen’s Own Rifles and the 13th Battalion Volunteer Militia (Infantry), Canada (now the Royal Hamilton Light Infantry) at the Battle of Ridgeway.

On 28 September 1866, the 37th Haldimand Battalion of Rifles was authorized. Its Regimental Headquarters was in York and had companies in York, Dunnville, Caledonia, Oneida, Hullsville, Cheapside and Mount Healy, Canada West (now Ontario).

On 8 May 1900, the 37th Haldimand Battalion of Rifles was Redesignated as the 37th Regiment Haldimand Rifles.

Great War 
On 22 December 1915, the 114th Battalion (Haldimand), CEF was authorized for service and on 31 October 1916, the battalion embarked for Great Britain. After its arrival in the UK, on 11 November 1916, the battalion's personnel were absorbed by the 35th Reserve Battalion, CEF and the 36th Reserve Battalion, CEF to provide reinforcements for the Canadian Corps in the field. On 21 May 1917, the 114th Battalion, CEF was disbanded.

1920s–1930s 
On 1 April 1921, as a result of the Otter Commission and the following reorganization of the Canadian Militia, the 37th Regiment Haldimand Rifles was Redesignated as The Haldimand Rifles.

On 15 December 1936, as a result of the 1936 Canadian Militia Reorganization, The Haldimand Rifles was Amalgamated with The Dufferin Rifles of Canada and “C” Company of the 3rd Machine Gun Battalion, CMGC (now The Argyll and Sutherland Highlanders of Canada (Princess Louise's)), to form The Dufferin and Haldimand Rifles of Canada.

Organization

37th Haldimand Battalion of Rifles (28 September, 1866) 

 No. 1 Company (York, Ontario) (first raised on 27 August, 1862, as the York Rifle Company)
 No. 2 Company (Dunnville, Ontario) (first raised on 24 July, 1856 as the Dunnville Rifle Company)
 No. 3 Company (Caledonia, Ontario) (first raised on 27 August, 1862 as the Caledonia Rifle Company)
 No. 4 Company (Oneida, Ontario) (first raised on 6 July, 1866 as the Oneida Infantry Company)
 No. 5 Company (Walpole, Ontario) (first raised on 31 August, 1866 as the Walpole Infantry Company)
 No. 6 Company (Cheapside, Ontario) (first raised on 14 September, 1866 as the Cheapside Infantry Company)

Battle Honours 

 Hill 70
 Ypres, 1917

Notable members 
 Brigadier Oliver Milton Martin
 Colonel James Walker

References 

Rifle regiments of Canada
Military units and formations of Ontario
Military units and formations disestablished in 1936